Ian Britton may refer to:

Ian Britton (English footballer) (born 1956),  English former football player and manager and current rugby union coach
Ian Britton (Scottish footballer) (1954–2016), Scottish footballer who played in midfield